Dominik Grzegorz Furman (born 6 July 1992) is a Polish professional footballer who plays as a midfielder for Ekstraklasa club Wisła Płock.

Career

Furman started his career with Legia Warsaw.

Career statistics

Honours
Legia Warsaw
 Polish Cup: 2011–12, 2012–13, 2014–15, 2015–16
 Ekstraklasa: 2012–13, 2013–14, 2015–16

References

External links

1992 births
Living people
People from Szydłowiec
Association football midfielders
Polish footballers
Poland international footballers
Poland youth international footballers
Poland under-21 international footballers
Polish expatriate footballers
Ekstraklasa players
Ligue 1 players
Serie A players
Süper Lig players
Legia Warsaw players
Toulouse FC players
Hellas Verona F.C. players
Wisła Płock players
Gençlerbirliği S.K. footballers
Expatriate footballers in France
Polish expatriate sportspeople in France
Expatriate footballers in Italy
Polish expatriate sportspeople in Italy
Expatriate footballers in Turkey
Polish expatriate sportspeople in Turkey